Fifty Shades of Black is a 2016 American slapstick romantic comedy film directed by Michael Tiddes and starring Marlon Wayans, who also serves as co-writer and co-producer. A parody of the 2015 erotic romantic drama film Fifty Shades of Grey, the film co-stars Kali Hawk, Affion Crockett, Jane Seymour, Andrew Bachelor, Florence Henderson, Jenny Zigrino, Fred Willard and Mike Epps.

The film was released theatrically on January 29, 2016 to near universally negative reviews. Despite this, it was a box office success, grossing $22 million worldwide from a $5 million budget. It was also Florence Henderson's last film before her death on November 24, 2016, which was 10 months after the film was released.

Plot 
Christian Black introduces shy college student Hannah Steale to the world of "romance" after she interviews him for her school newspaper. Their kinky relationship stumbles forward despite Christian's shortcomings as a lover and the antics of his racist adoptive mother Claire, his well-endowed brother Eli and Hannah's hyper-sexual roommate Kateesha.

Cast

Production 
On June 3, 2015, it was announced that Open Road Films had acquired the US distribution rights to the yet-to-be made film for $5 million.

Principal photography on the film began August 11, 2015, in Los Angeles.

Release 
The film was released in North America on January 29, 2016, alongside Kung Fu Panda 3, The Finest Hours, and Jane Got a Gun. The film was projected to gross $10–11 million from 2,075 theaters in its opening weekend. The film grossed $275,000 from its Thursday night previews, $2.3 million on its first day, and $5.9 million in its opening weekend, finishing 10th at the box office.  The film was released on DVD and Blu-ray on April 19, 2016.

Reception

Critical response 
On Rotten Tomatoes, the film has an approval rating of 4% based on 46 reviews; the average rating is 2.79/10. The site's consensus reads, "Wildly erratic even for a spoof movie, Fifty Shades of Black bears the unfortunate distinction of offering fewer laughs than the unintentionally funny film it's trying to lampoon." On Metacritic, the film has a score of 28 out of 100 based on 11 critics, indicating "generally unfavorable reviews". Audiences polled by CinemaScore gave the film an average grade of "C" on an A+ to F scale.

Critic Mark Kermode dismissed Fifty Shades of Black as another lame parody film, among the likes of Scary Movie (2000), Epic Movie (2007) and Vampires Suck (2010). Austin film critic Korey Coleman ended his review by starting an online petition to stop Marlon Wayans from making any more parody films. He gave it the #1 spot for the worst movie of 2016, tying it with Yoga Hosers.

Kermode was critical of the humor: "Cue jokes about wallet and car theft, fried chicken and Bill Cosby, alongside glasshouse/brick complaints about EL James being a rubbish writer. When it all runs out of steam, the cock-and-ball routines downshift into riffs from Whiplash and Magic Mike, but sadly, these aren’t funny either." J.R. Jones condemned the jokes as a set of "amplified racial stereotypes and misogynistic swipes", citing the running gag of male characters calling Hawk's character "ugly", as well as the rape jokes, as examples. Henry Barnes claimed there is a "Cosby joke, a Kanye joke and huge spaces where the laughs should be", particularly arguing that the "abuse is amplified out of the realm of satire into a weird hinterland of really unfunny gross-out and blaxploitation revenge flick".

Jones did, however, highlight the "impressive attention to detail, meticulously re-creating the original film's costumes and sets, and Kali Hawk nails her Dakota Johnson impression as the virginal protagonist".

Accolades

See also 
 List of black films of the 2010s

References

External links 
 
 
 
 
 

2016 films
2016 romantic comedy films
2010s parody films
2010s sex comedy films
Adultery in films
African-American comedy films
African-American films
American parody films
American romantic comedy films
American sex comedy films
American slapstick comedy films
BDSM in films
2010s English-language films
Films directed by Michael Tiddes
Films scored by James Dooley
Films shot in Los Angeles
IM Global films
Open Road Films films
Vertigo Films films
2010s American films